The Interstate Highways in Utah are maintained by the Utah Department of Transportation (UDOT). The Interstate Highway System is a nationwide system with only a small portion of these routes entering Utah. Originally, the State Road Commission of Utah, created on March 23, 1909 was responsible for maintenance, but these duties were rolled into the new UDOT in 1975. One unique former route is Interstate 415, which was never signed as such, and was only used as a temporary designation for the eastern portion of what is now the Interstate 215 belt loop around Salt Lake City.

List

See also

References

External links

 Utah Highways Page by Dan Stober (wayback archive)

 
Interstate